Manderdisa railway station is an Indian railway station of the Lumding–Sabroom section in the Northeast Frontier Railway zone of Indian Railways. The station is situated at Manderdisa in Dima Hasao district in the Indian state of Assam. It serves Manderdisa and surroundings areas. Distance between Lumding Junction and Manderdisa is  10 km (144 mi).

Details
The station lies on the 312 km long  broad-gauge Lumding–Sabroom railway line which comes under the Lumding railway division of the Northeast Frontier Railway zone of Indian Railways. It is a single line without electrification.

Station

Station layout

Platforms 
There are a total of 2 platforms and 3 tracks. The platforms are connected by foot overbridge.

References

External links
 Indian Railways site
 Indian railway fan club

Railway stations in Dima Hasao district
Lumding railway division